is a town in Iwate Prefecture, Japan. , the town had an estimated population of 27,227, and a population density of 400 persons per km² in 10,131 households.

Geography
Yahaba is located in central Iwate Prefecture, bordered by Morioka city to the north, Shiwa town to the south and Shizukuishi to the west.

Neighboring municipalities
Iwate Prefecture
Morioka
Shiwa
Shizukuishi

Climate
Yahaba has a humid oceanic climate (Köppen climate classification Cfa) characterized by mild summers and cold winters. The average annual temperature in Yahaba is 10.1 °C. The average annual rainfall is 1341 mm with September as the wettest month and February as the driest month. The temperatures are highest on average in August, at around 23.8 °C, and lowest in January, at around -2.6 °C.

Demographics
Per Japanese census data, the population of Yahaba has seen a long and steady increase over the past century.

History
The area of present-day Yahaba was part of ancient Mutsu Province, and has been settled since at least the Jōmon period. The area was inhabited by the Emishi people, and came under the control of the Yamato dynasty during the early Heian period with the construction  a fortified settlement, by Sakanoue no Tamuramaro in 813 AD. During the Sengoku period, the area was dominated by various samurai clans before coming under the control of the Nambu clan during the late Sengoku period, who ruled Morioka Domain under the Edo period Tokugawa shogunate.

After the start of the Meiji period, the villages of Kemuyama, Tokuda and Fudo were established within Shiwa District by the establishment of the modern municipalities system on April 1, 1889. The three villages merged on March 1, 1955 to form Yahaba village, which was raised to town status on May 1, 1966.

Government
Yahaba has a mayor-council form of government with a directly elected mayor and a unicameral city legislature of 18 members. Yahaba, and the town of Shiwa collectively contribute two seats to the Iwate Prefectural legislature. In terms of national politics, the city is part of Iwate 1st district of the lower house of the Diet of Japan.

Economy
The local economy of Yahaba is traditionally based on agriculture, primarily rice cultivation. However, due to its proximity to Morioka, light industries and warehousing have been increasing in importance, and the town is increasingly becoming a bedroom community for Morioka.

Education
Yahaba has four public elementary schools and two public junior high schools operated by the town government and two public high schools operated by the Iwate Prefectural Board of Education.

In addition, the College of Pharmacy of the Iwate Medical University is located in Yahaba.

Transportation

Railway
 East Japan Railway Company (JR East) -Tōhoku Main Line

Highway
  – Yahaba IC

International relations
 - Fremont, Michigan, USA (friendship city since July 22, 1995)

Local attractions
Site of Tokutan Castle, a national historic site

References

External links

Official Website 

 
Towns in Iwate Prefecture